Godalming Cricket Club is based at Godalming in Surrey, and was briefly a senior cricket team, playing 12 known first-class cricket matches between 1821 and 1825. Its home ground then was The Burys but is now Holloway Hill recreation ground.

Julius Caesar began his career at Godalming where he attracted local press attention at age 16, in the Surrey Gazette. He helped Godalming beat a Surrey XI at The Oval in 1849, aged 18, by making scores of 67 and 46.

Recent history
The club now plays home matches at Holloway Hill Sports Association's recreation ground in Godalming with clubhouse facilities in the pavilion. It is a CASC registered club with HM Revenue and Customs.

In August 2004 the club played an Old England XI including John Lever, Derek Randall and Derek Underwood in a charity event to raise funds for Chace Children's Hospice.

In February 2006, an arson attack destroyed the pavilion at nearby Thursley Cricket Club. Within hours, Godalming had offered the use of its facilities to Thursley.

References

Bibliography
 Arthur Haygarth, Scores & Biographies, Volume 1 (1744–1826), Lillywhite, 1862

English cricket in the 19th century
Sports clubs established in the 1820s
English club cricket teams
Cricket in Surrey
Godalming